These are the official results of the athletics competition at the 2013 Mediterranean Games which took place on 26–29 June 2013 in Mersin, Turkey.

Men's results

100 metres

Heats – 27 JuneWind:Heat 1: +0.2 m/s, Heat 2: +0.4 m/s

Final – 27 JuneWind:+0.2 m/s

200 metres

Heats – 26 JuneWind:Heat 1: -0.4 m/s, Heat 2: -0.9 m/s

Final – 26 JuneWind:-0.7 m/s

400 metres

Heats – 27 June

Final – 28 June

800 metres

Heats – 28 June

Final – 29 June

1500 metres
27 June

5000 metres
29 June

10,000 metres
29 June

Half marathon
29 June

110 metres hurdles

Heats – 26 JuneWind:Heat 1: -0.6 m/s, Heat 2: -1.5 m/s

Final – 26 JuneWind:-0.8 m/s

400 metres hurdles

Heats – 28 June

Final – 29 June

3000 metres steeplechase
28 June

4 × 100 metres relay
28 June

4 × 400 metres relay
29 June

High jump
June 27

Pole vault
June 28

Long jump
June 29

Triple jump
June 26

Shot put
June 29

Discus throw
June 27

Hammer throw
June 28

Javelin throw
June 26

Women's results

100 metres

Heats – 27 JuneWind:Heat 1: +0.2 m/s, Heat 2: +0.4 m/s

Final – 27 JuneWind:-0.7 m/s

200 metres

Heats – 26 JuneWind:Heat 1: -1.4 m/s, Heat 2: -1.3 m/s

Final – 26 JuneWind:-1.8 m/s

400 metres
28 June

800 metres
29 June

1500 metres
26 June

5000 metres
28 June

10,000 metres
June 26

Half marathon
June 29

100 metres hurdles
June 28Wind: -0.3 m/s

400 metres hurdles
June 27

3000 metres steeplechase
June 28

4 × 100 metres relay
28 June

4 × 400 metres relay
29 June

20 kilometres walk
June 27

High jump
June 29

Pole vault
June 26

Long jump
June 27

Triple jump
June 28

Discus throw
June 29

Hammer throw
June 26

Javelin throw
June 28

Heptathlon
June 28–29

References

External links
Full results

Mediterranean Games
2013 Results
Sports at the 2013 Mediterranean Games